B5, B05, B-5 may refer to:

Biology
 ATC code B05 (Blood substitutes and perfusion solutions), a therapeutic subgroup of the Anatomical Therapeutic Chemical Classification System
 Cytochrome b5, ubiquitous electron transport hemoproteins
 Cytochrome b5, type A, a human microsomal cytochrome b5
 HLA-B5, an HLA-B serotype
 Pantothenic acid (a.k.a. vitamin B5), a water-soluble vitamin
 Procyanidin B5, a B type proanthocyanidin

Entertainment
 Alekhine's Defence (ECO code B5), a chess opening beginning with the moves e4 Nf6
 B5 (band), an R&B boy band
 B5 (album), B5's self-titled debut album
 Babylon 5, an American science fiction television series
 The Be Five, a band formed by castmembers of Babylon 5

Transport
 Amadeus (airline) (IATA code: B5), an airline based in Germany (1996–2004)
 B5 and B5 DOHC, models of the Mazda B engine series
 B-5, the manufacturer's model number for the Blackburn Baffin biplane
 B5 platform, the series designator for Audi A4 from 1994–2001
 Bundesstraße 5, a German federal highway
 , a Royal Navy B-class submarine
 Keystone B-5, a light bomber made for the US Army Air Corps in the early 1930s
 Kinner B-5, a popular five cylinder American radial engine of the 1930s
 NSB B5 (Class 5), a series of passenger carriages built by Strømmens Værksted for the Norwegian State Railways
 PRR B5, an American 0-6-0 steam locomotive
 SM UB-5, a German Type UB I submarine or U-boat in the German Imperial Navy
 B5 biodiesel
 LNER Class B5, a British class of steam locomotives

Other
 Baseball5, the five-a-side version of baseball
 B5 Championships, a 2001 fighting game tournament
 %B5, the percent-encoding for the letter μ
 B5, a paper size of the B series defined in ISO 216
 B5, a category of stellar classification
 Bensen B-5, a small rotor kite
 Border Five

See also 
 BV (disambiguation)
 Big Five (disambiguation)